Statistics of JSL Cup in the 1985 season.

Overview
It was contested by 20 teams, and Yomiuri won the championship.

Results

1st round
Yanmar Diesel 3-1 Kofu
Nippon Kokan 5-0 Kyoto Police
Sumitomo Metals 1-2 Matsushita Electric
Furukawa Electric 5-1 Tanabe Pharmaceuticals
Hitachi 0-1 Toshiba
Mazda 1-1 (PK 5–6) Toyota Motors
Honda 6-0 TDK
Fujita Industries 2-0 Nippon Steel

2nd round
Nissan Motors 5-0 Yanmar Diesel
Nippon Kokan 1-2 Mitsubishi Motors
Seino Transportations 0-2 Matsushita Electric
Furukawa Electric 4-1 Osaka Gas
Yomiuri 5-2 Toshiba
Toyota Motors 0-1 Yamaha Motors
Fujitsu 0-3 Honda
Fujita Industries 1-1 (PK 5–4) All Nippon Airways

Quarterfinals
Nissan Motors 4-0 Mitsubishi Motors
Matsushita Electric 0-1 Furukawa Electric
Yomiuri 3-1 Yamaha Motors
Honda 1-1 (PK 5–4) Fujita Industries

Semifinals
Nissan Motors 1-0 Furukawa Electric
Yomiuri 3-1 Honda

Final
Nissan Motors 0-2 Yomiuri
Yomiuri won the championship

References
 

JSL Cup
League Cup